Jovana Sazdovska (born 27 June 1993) is a Macedonian female handballer who plays as a left wing for Dunărea Brăila and the North Macedonia national team.

International honours  
EHF Champions League: 
Finalist: 2018

References
  

1993 births
Living people
Sportspeople from Skopje
Macedonian female handball players
Expatriate handball players  
Macedonian expatriate sportspeople in Germany  
Macedonian expatriate sportspeople in Romania
Mediterranean Games competitors for North Macedonia
Competitors at the 2018 Mediterranean Games